Jayson S. Faatz (October 24, 1860 – April 10, 1923) was an American Major League Baseball player born in Weedsport, New York, who played at first base for three teams during his four-season career.

Career
In his last season, he was named player-manager for a short time with the  Buffalo Bisons of the Players' League, the only season in the league's existence.

After his baseball days were over, among Jay's post-career occupations included insurance salesman.  Jay died in Syracuse, New York at the age of 62, and was buried in the Weedsport Rural Cemetery.

References

External links

1860 births
1923 deaths
19th-century baseball players
Baseball players from New York (state)
Major League Baseball first basemen
Pittsburgh Alleghenys players
Cleveland Blues (1887–88) players
Cleveland Spiders players
Buffalo Bisons (PL) players
Baseball player-managers
Minor league baseball managers
Saginaw Greys players
Toledo Avengers players
Syracuse Stars (minor league baseball) players
Toronto Canucks players
Utica Stars players
Rochester Flour Cities players
People from Weedsport, New York
American expatriate baseball players in Canada
New Castle Quakers players